Following is a list of senators of Eure-et-Loir, people who have represented the department of Eure-et-Loir in the Senate of France.

Third Republic

Senators for Eure-et-Loir under the French Third Republic were:

 Jacques Delacroix (1876–1885)
 Émile Labiche (1876–1921)
 Ferdinand Jumeau (1885)
 Pierre Dreux (1885–1888)
 Louis Vinet (1888–1921)
 Georges Fessard (1905–1912)
 Louis Baudet (1912–1918)
 Albert Royneau (1920–1921)
 Gustave Lhopiteau (1912–1930)
 Paul Deschanel (1921–1922)
 Henri Villette–Gaté (1922–1928)
 Jean Valadier (1928–1944)
 Albert Royneau (1921–1922)
 Paul Bouvart (1922–1933)
 Maurice Viollette (1930–1939)
 Jacques Benoist (1933–1939)
 Jacques Gautron (1939–1944)
 Raymond Gilbert (1939–1944)

Fourth Republic

Senators for Eure-et-Loir under the French Fourth Republic were:

 Charles Brune (1946–1956) – died in office
 François Levacher (1956–1959)
 Robert Brizard (1946–1959)

Fifth Republic 
Senators for Eure-et-Loir under the French Fifth Republic:

References

Sources

 
Lists of members of the Senate (France) by department